Two Mile Creek is a stream in the U.S. state of Wisconsin. It is a tributary to the Yellow River.

Two Mile Creek was named from its distance,  from Dexterville.

References

Rivers of Wood County, Wisconsin
Rivers of Wisconsin